Hinterschmiding is a municipality in the district of Freyung-Grafenau in Bavaria in Germany. Populated places within the municipality include Vorderschmiding.

References

Freyung-Grafenau